Dipali Barthakur (30 January 1941 – 21 December 2018) was an Indian singer from Assam. Her songs were sung mainly in the Assamese language. She received the fourth-highest civilian award of India, the Padma Shri, in the year 1998.

Early life
Barthakur was born in 1941 to Bishwanath Borthakur and Chandrakanti Devi in Sonari at Sivasagar, Assam.

Musical career
Barthakur started her career as a singer early. When she was studying in class nine, in 1958, she sang the song "Mor Bopai Lahori" on All India Radio, Guwahati, and the song "Joubone Amoni Kore Chenaidhon" for the film Lachit Borphukan (1959).

Some of her other popular Assamese songs are:

"Sonor Kharu Nalage Muk"
"Joubone Aamoni Kore, Chenaidhon"
"Jundhone Junalite"
"Konmana Boroxire Sip"
"Senai Moi Jau Dei"
"O' Bondhu Somoi Pale Amar Phale"

Personal life
Barthakur sang her last song "Luito nejabi boi" in 1969. After that she began suffering from a severe motor neuron disease which hindered her singing and forced her to use a wheelchair. In 1976 she married Neel Pawan Barua, an eminent Indian artist and painter from Assam and son of renowned Assamese writer Binanda Chandra Barua.

Barthakur died on 21 December 2018 at Nemcare Hospital, Guwahati, after a prolonged illness. She was known as "Nightingale of Assam".

Awards
Barthakur was honored many times, most notably with the Padma Shri award for folk and traditional music in 1990–92.

Some of her awards/ recognitions are listed below:
 Padma Shri (1998) for her contribution to the Arts by the Government of India.
 Silipi Bota (2010) from Government of Assam.
 Aideu Handique Silpi Award (2012) by the Sadou Asom Lekhika Somaroh Samiti.

References

1941 births
2018 deaths
Singers from Assam
People from Sivasagar district
Indian women folk singers
Indian folk singers
Assamese playback singers
Assamese-language singers
Recipients of the Padma Shri in arts
Women musicians from Assam
20th-century Indian singers
20th-century Indian women singers
21st-century Indian singers
21st-century Indian women singers